Bibliophilia or bibliophilism is the love of books. A bibliophile or bookworm is an individual who loves and frequently reads and/or collects books.

Profile
The classic bibliophile is one who loves to read, admire and collect books, often amassing a large and specialized collection. Bibliophiles usually possess books they love or that hold special value as well as old editions with unusual bindings, autographed, or illustrated copies. "Bibliophile" is an appropriate term for a minority of those who are book collectors.

Usage of the term
Bibliophilia is not to be confused with bibliomania, a potential symptom of obsessive–compulsive disorder involving the collecting of books to the extent that interpersonal relations or health may be negatively affected, and in which the mere fact that a physical object is a book is sufficient for it to be collected or beloved. Some use the term "bibliomania" interchangeably with "bibliophily", and in fact, the Library of Congress does not use the term "bibliophily," but rather refers to its readers as either book collectors or bibliomaniacs.

History
According to Arthur H. Minters, the "private collecting of books was a fashion indulged in by many Romans, including Cicero and Atticus". The term bibliophile entered the English language in 1820. A bibliophile is to be distinguished from the much older notion of a bookman (which dates back to 1583), who is one who loves books, and especially reading; more generally, a bookman is one who participates in writing, publishing, or selling books.

Lord Spencer and the Marquess of Blandford were noted bibliophiles. "The Roxburghe sale quickly became a foundational myth for the burgeoning secondhand book trade, and remains so to this day"; this sale is memorable due to the competition between "Lord Spencer and the marquis of Blandford [which] drove [the price of a probable first edition of Boccaccio's Decameron up to the astonishing and unprecedented sum of £2,260". J. P. Morgan was also a noted bibliophile. In 1884, he paid $24,750 ($772,130.92, adjusted for inflation for 2021) for a 1459 edition of the Mainz Psalter.

See also

 Book collecting
 Bibliophobia
 Oxford University Society of Bibliophiles, UK
 United States:
 Antiquarian book trade in the United States
 The Book Club of Detroit
 Caxton Club, Chicago
 The Club of Odd Volumes, Boston
 Grolier Club, New York
 Bibliophile mailing list

Similar terms
 Audiophilia
 Cinephilia
 Comicphilia
 Telephilia
 Videophilia

References

Notes

Citations

Further reading

 Bulletin du Bibliophile (1834-) Bulletin du bibliophile (1834). Since 1963 published by the Association Internationale de Bibliophilie.
 Richard de Bury (1902). The Love of Books: "The Philobiblon" translated by E. C. Thomas. London: Alexander Moring
 Rugg, Julie (2006). A Book Addict's Treasury. London: Frances Lincoln 
 Thomas Frognall Dibdin (1809). Bibliomania. New York, Henry G. Bohn.
 Andrew Lang (1881). The Library. London, Macmillan & Co.
 Stebbins, Robert A. (2013). The Committed Reader: Reading for Utility, Pleasure, and Fulfillment in the Twenty-First Century. Lanham, MD: Scarecrow.
 Purcell, M. (2019). The Role of Librarians in a Historical Age of Obsession. Literary Hub.

External links

 Forbes article on bibliomania, by Finn-Olaf Jones, December 12, 2005] (archived 14 September 2007)

 
Antiquarian booksellers
 
Reading (process)